Sextape is a 2018 French comedy film directed by . It was screened in the Un Certain Regard section at the 2018 Cannes Film Festival. Film critic Lisa Nesselson writing for Screen Daily found the film was "an invaluable and frank conversation-starter in the arena of what constitutes sexual harassment and what can be done about reducing it", while Todd McCarthy writing for The Hollywood Reporter called it "a nugget of truth wrapped in a gross and vulgar package." Its had a theatrical release in France on 6 June 2018.

Cast 
 Souad Arsane as Yasmina
 Inas Chanti as Rim
 Loubna Abidar as The mother

References

External links 
 

2018 films
2018 comedy films
French comedy films
2010s French-language films
2010s French films